The North Shore is a region of Nova Scotia, Canada. Although it has no formal identity and is variously defined by geographic, county and other political boundaries, it is defined by Statistics Canada as an economic region, composed of Antigonish County, Colchester County, Cumberland County, Guysborough County, and Pictou County.

References

Geography of Cumberland County, Nova Scotia
Geography of Antigonish County, Nova Scotia
Geography of Guysborough County, Nova Scotia
Geography of Pictou County
Region of Queens Municipality
Geography of Colchester County
Geographic regions of Nova Scotia